The sport of football in the country of Cook Islands is run by the Cook Islands Football Association, a full member of the OFC and FIFA. The association administers the national football team. CIFA registered 13 full members as in football clubs, 6 Rarotonga Football Clubs (Avatiu Football Club, Matavera-Ngatangiia Football Club, Nikao Sokattak Football Club, Puaikura Football Club, Titikaveka Football Club, Tupapa Maraerenga Football Club); 7 Island associations Aitutaki Football Association, Atiu Football Association, Mangaia Football Association, Mauke Football Association, Mitiaro Football Association, Pukapuka Football Association and Rakahanga Football Association; and 3 associate members, Manihiki, Nassau and Penrhyn.

National football stadium

References